Paris Métro Line 13 (opened as Line B; French: Ligne 13 du métro de Paris) is one of the sixteen lines of the Paris Métro. It was built by the Nord-Sud Company before becoming Line 13 when the Nord-Sud was merged into the Compagnie du chemin de fer métropolitain de Paris (CMP) in 1930. Line 13 was extended in 1976 to reach the northern end of Line 14, which was then absorbed into it. The number 14 was eventually reused for a new line in 1998.

Line 13 was once planned to be replaced by a north–south RER line, but this was cancelled after the reorganisation of the Île-de-France region in 1965. Today, Line 13 connects the western part of Paris to the suburbs of Asnières-sur-Seine, Gennevilliers, Clichy, Saint-Denis and Saint-Ouen-sur-Seine in the north and to Malakoff, Vanves, Châtillon and Montrouge in the south. Serving 32 stations, it is the network's fifth busiest line, with 131.4 million passengers in 2017.

The line will be automated in the early 2030s, becoming the third Paris Metro line to be converted to driverless operation.

Route 
At  in length, counting both of its northern branches, it is the longest line of the Métro. In 2004, it carried over 114 million riders, about 540,000 per weekday. Annual traffic grew by about ten million passengers after the opening of two new stations on the Asnières branch on 14 June 2008. According to data from December 2009, there are 610,050 riders per day.

Line 13's use of two northern branches serving highly populated areas, its long length, extension into the suburbs, and rapid development of areas that it serves have culminated in the line's overloading, further highlighted by associations representing passengers. It is the most crowded line in the system, especially the section closest to Saint-Lazare.

History

Chronology
26 February 1911: Line B of the Nord-Sud company was opened from Saint-Lazare to Porte de Saint-Ouen.
20 January 1912: A second branch of Line B was opened between La Fourche and Porte de Clichy.
1930: The Nord-Sud company was bought by the CMP company. Line B became Line 13, and the Nord-Sud's planned future Line C was assigned the number 14.
21 January 1937: The original Line 14 was opened between Bienvenüe and Porte de Vanves.
27 July 1937: Line 14 was extended north from Bienvenüe to Duroc and took over the section between Duroc and Invalides from Line 10.
30 June 1952: Line 13 was extended north from Porte de Saint-Ouen to Carrefour Pleyel.
27 June 1973: The line was extended south from Saint-Lazare to Miromesnil.
18 February 1975: The line was extended south from Miromesnil to Champs-Elysées – Clémenceau.
26 May 1976:  The line was extended north from Carrefour Pleyel to Saint-Denis – Basilique.
9 November 1976: The line was extended from Champs-Elysées to Invalides. Line 14 was eliminated as a separate line (leaving its number available to be reused in 1998) and incorporated into Line 13. The line was extended south from Porte de Vanves to Châtillon – Montrouge.
9 May 1980: The northwestern branch of the line was extended from Porte de Clichy to Gabriel Péri.
25 May 1998: The northern branch was extended from Basilique de Saint-Denis to Saint-Denis – Université.
14 June 2008: The northwestern branch was extended from Gabriel Péri to Les Courtilles.

Line B of the Nord-Sud Company

On 28 December 1901, the Société du chemin de fer éléctrique souterrain Nord-Sud de Paris, or Nord-Sud Company, obtained a concession from the City of Paris to build a rapid transit network of two lines concurrent with the more prominent CMP, which had already opened the first lines of the Métro.

Four years later, building commenced on the branch to Porte de Clichy. The line ran under Rue d'Amsterdam until its split at La Fourche, with each branch following either the Avenue de Clichy or the Avenue de Saint-Ouen. No connection was provided to the CMP.

On 26 February 1911, Line B opened between Saint-Lazare and Porte de Saint-Ouen, with the northwestern branch to Porte de Clichy opening a year later. Due to the narrow width of Rue d'Amsterdam, Berlin (renamed to Liège) station was built unusually with non-aligned platforms. The Nord-Sud Company operated Line B with 368 trains per day, a minimum of 2.5-minute headways.

On 1 January 1930, the CMP absorbed the Nord-Sud Company and renamed Line B to Line 13 in accordance with its numerical naming policy. The electrical supply also needed to be changed; the Nord-Sud Company used overhead power, while the CMP relied on third rail technology. In order to allow interoperability, Line 13 was switched to third rail power.

Overcrowding

Line 13 is perhaps the least-appreciated line of the Métro by riders and is the object of a number of criticisms on part of its constant overcrowding, especially north of Saint-Lazare where the line splits in two, leading to reduced frequencies. It is not rare for passengers to wait for several trains to load before being able to board due to the sheer volume of users. Within trains, there may be up to 4.5 people per square metre, while the cars on Line 13 can only hold four people per square metre.

In December 2003, the extension of Line 14 to Saint-Lazare resulted in a large increase of passengers using the station; within a year, the number of people using Saint-Lazare rose from 40.8 million to 64.1 million. Due to this, the chronic congestion of Line 13 has only worsened.

Important economic development at the Plaine Saint-Denis around a vast urban project since the construction of the Stade de France has also worsened conditions on the line since a number of companies have moved there, forcing more employees to use the line for their commutes.

In 2007, the delay of the automatic control system named Ouragan led the RATP to propose to STIF the employment of "pushers" (poussers, control assistants), responsible for smoother boarding and detraining at the busiest stations on Line 13.

Interim measures

Since December 2006, more than eighty additional trains have been added to provide supplemental service, a nearly 10% increase including additional Asnières branch service. Two years later, an automatic reversal at Châtillon-Montrouge went into effect, which reduces the turn-back time by ten seconds so as to circulate trains every 95 seconds. This has in turn required the installation of platform screen doors to prevent passengers from falling onto the tracks when no train operator is on board.

On 17 December 2006, Line 13 has had its own command post and centralised control (poste de commande et de contrôle centralisé, PCC) managed from Malakoff. It involves the coordination of a number of officials to reduce the number of delays and incidents on the line. Since 29 July 2008, the PCC integrates the manoeuvre and start functions that were previously operated at each terminal.

At the end of 2010, it was revealed that ten stations would receive platform screen door installation in an attempt to increase the average speed of trains and reduce track-related incidents. After a test a few years earlier, the RATP decided that such doors must be built as crowding increases so that passengers cannot fall off the platform; to do this, the agency recruited the Kaba Group to perform automation and installation on Lines 1 and 13. The company uses the ClearSy security system to control door opening and closing. However, the new platform screen doors are not the same as the prototypes installed at Invalides.

On 29 December 2009, the RATP announced that Miromesnil would be the first of twelve stations to be equipped with these doors and that work would begin in June 2010, finishing three months later. After that, the following stations will receive platform screen doors: Saint-Lazare, Champs-Élysées – Clemenceau, Basilique de Saint-Denis, Saint-Denis – Porte de Paris, Invalides (replacement), Varenne, Saint-François-Xavier, Duroc, Liège, Montparnasse-Bienvenüe, and Place de Clichy.

Line 14 extension north 
Various solutions were investigated to enhance capacity on line 13, including splitting the line in two (a 13bis line), extending line 14 to La Fourche and have it take over a branch from Line 13, or extending line 14 to Porte de Clichy and Mairie de Saint-Ouen providing an express link to Saint-Lazare and downtown as well as a direct connection between the suburbs Clichy and Saint-Ouen. 

The last solution was the one that was adopted, and the extension of line 14 to Mairie de Saint-Ouen opened in December 2020. According to Île-de-France Mobilités, this extension has removed 19 to 27% of peak hour traffic from line 13.

Automation 
In December 2022, Île-de-France Mobilités and RATP announced that the line would be fully automated by 2035, becoming the 3rd metro line in Paris to be converted to unattended train operation after Line 1 and Line 4. The line will be modernised in two phases - the introduction of the new trains (MF 19) from 2027, followed by the automation of the line in the early 2030s. The automation of the line itself is estimated to cost around €837m.

Future extensions 

Route

Enhancements 
The trains on Line 13 were refurbished in the 2000s, and the first refitted train entered service in January 2007. These refitted trains have new features such as automatic displays and announcements, which are now added to all new or refitted rolling stock but also a reduced number of seats to allow for more standing passengers. The capacity of each train is increased by 26.

Renamed stations
20 January 1912: Marcadet renamed as Marcadet – Balagny.
1 August 1914: Berlin renamed as Liège.
27 January 1946: Marcadet – Balagny renamed as Guy Môquet.
25 May 1998: Saint-Denis – Basilique renamed as Basilique de Saint-Denis.
14 June 2008: Gabriel Péri – Asnières – Gennevilliers renamed as Gabriel Péri.

Tourism
Line 13 passes near several places of interest:
Saint-Denis and its medieval basilica, which contains the tombs of the kings of France and the Stade de France.
Saint-Ouen and its famous flea market.
The lower Champs-Élysées near the Grand Palais and the Petit Palais.
The Invalides, which contains the tomb of Napoléon Bonaparte.
Montparnasse, its famous cafés and the Montparnasse Tower.

See also

References

External links

  RATP official website
  RATP english speaking website
  Interactive Map of the RER (from RATP's website)
  Interactive Map of the Paris métro (from RATP's website)
  Mobidf website, dedicated to the RER (unofficial)
  Metro-Pole website, dedicated to Paris public transports (unofficial)
  Ensemble pour la ligne 13 website, Petition web site protesting about crowding and lack of development on line 13(unofficial)

 
Railway lines opened in 1911
1911 establishments in France